Taip arba Ne is the Lithuanian version of the television gameshow Deal or No Deal. It is hosted by singer/journalist Marijonas Mikutavičius.

There are 22 cases with values go from as little as 5 litai (about US$1.93, €1.45, 98p, ¥230) to 500,000 litai (about US$193,000, €145,000, £98,000, ¥23,000,000). Later it was reduced to 20 cases with 200,000 litai as the top prize.

Case values

2007 - 2010

2010

External links 
Unofficial site of TAIP arba NE
Deal or No Deal
Lithuanian television shows
TV3 (Lithuania) original programming